Rhipha perflammans is a moth in the family Erebidae. It was described by Paul Dognin in 1914. It is found in French Guiana.

References

Moths described in 1914
Phaegopterina